Bernard of Trilia (Bernard de la Treille, Bernardus de Trilia) (Nîmes, c. 1240 – 1292) was a French Dominican theologian and scholastic philosopher. He was an early supporter of the teaching of Thomas Aquinas. He lectured at Montpellier.

Notes

External links
Works listed

1240 births
1292 deaths
French Dominicans
Medieval French theologians
Scholastic philosophers